The Lynchburg Expressway is a freeway in Lynchburg, Virginia, United States. It carries portions of

U.S. Route 29 Business
 U.S. Route 501

Transportation in Virginia
Transportation in Lynchburg, Virginia
Freeways in the United States
U.S. Route 29
U.S. Route 501